XMedia Recode is a freeware video and audio transcoding program for Microsoft Windows developed by Sebastian Dörfler. It can import and export many types of files such as WMV, MP4, MP3, 3GP, Matroska and more.  XMedia Recode can convert unprotected DVDs or DVD files to any supported output file.  XMedia Recode features a drag-and-drop style interface and uses job queuing and batch processing to automate the task of transcoding multiple files.

The program is actively being updated. Recent additions include importing of external subtitles, better stability, latest x264/ffmpeg, video rotation, etc.

Features

 Output to "Video and Audio", "Video only" or "Audio only"
 Copy video and/or audio tracks from input file (to avoid conversion)
 Presets (called Profiles) for various media devices (e.g. PS3, Xbox 360, iPhone, PSP, Zune and more)
 Multiple languages (German, English, French, Italian, Japanese, Portuguese, Polish, Russian)
 Includes a Bitrate-Calculator that can calculate the required video bitrate to achieve a desired filesize based on various Media (CD, DVD, memory cards, etc.) Allows users to choose a percentage of the media for fine controlling.
 Supports multiple Audio Tracks
 Displays basic media info about each video using MediaInfo.  A more detailed view can be accessed from the right click context menu for each video.
 Supports batch processing when multiple videos are selected in the main interface (via ctrl+click or shift+click).  Multiple highlighted jobs will all have the same conversion settings and multiple jobs will be added simultaneously.
 Supports adding external audio tracks and subtitles files.

Video editing
 Box Blur
 Cutting
 Cropping (manual and auto crop)
 Padding
 Color correction
 Clip Speed
 Deblocking
 Delogo
 Denoising
 Flip Image
 Hue / Saturation
 Sepia
 Watermark
 Sharpening
 Channel inversion
 Grayscaling
 Deinterlacing
 Audio Channel Mapping
 Volume adjustment and audio normalization

Bitrate calculator

Xmedia Recode includes a bitrate calculator capable of sizing videos to fit various media including CD-R, DVD-5 (4.7 GB), DVD-9 (8.5 GB), and memory cards ranging from 128 MB to 32 GB. Videos can be calculated to a percentage of the selected media or a specific filesize. Unlike most bitrate calculators, it calculates the video and audio streams together.

The bitrate calculator is capable of configuring output settings like resolution, bitrate mode (e.g. ABR, 2-pass, etc.), framerate and similar settings for the audio track(s).

This function is missing in version 3.2.5.2, but the bitrate can still be set manually.

Supported input formats

 3GP, 3G2, AAC, AC3, AIFF, AMR, APE, ASF, AVI, AV1, AviSynth, AU, DVD, DTS, E-AC3, FLAC, FLV, H.261, H.263, H.264, H.265, M2TS, M1V, M2V, M3U, M3U8, M4A, M4P, M4V, Matroska, MMF, MP2, MP3, MP4, MP4V, MP3, MPEG-1, MPEG-2, MPEG-4, QuickTime, Ogg, OGM, OPUS, PVA, REC, RealMedia, RMVB, SVCD, SWF, THP, TS, TRP, TP0, VCD, VOB, WebM, WMA, WMV, WPL

Supported output formats

Video formats

 Asus V1, Asus V2, MPEG-4 Part 2, MS MPEG4 V2, MS MPEG4 V3 DV Video, Flash Video, Flash Screen Video, H.261, H.263, H.263+ H.264/MPEG-4 AVC (using x264 or NVENC), H.265/HEVC (using NVENC) Huffyuv, M-JPEG, MPEG-1, MPEG-2, Theora, VP8, WMV V7, WMV V8 NVENC is not supported anymore.

Audio formats

 AAC, AC3, ADPCM MICROSOFT, ADPCM YAMAHA, A-LAW, AMR NB, AMR WB, MP2, MP3, OPUS, Vorbis, WAV-PCM 16 little endian, WAV-PCM 16 little endian, WAV-PCM 24 Little-Endian, WAV-PCM U8, WMA V7, WMA V8

Subtitle formats

 .ass, .jss, .js, .ssa, .srt

Supported output device profiles

 Acer, Apple, Asus, Archos, BlackBerry, Cowon, Creative Labs, Dell, DVD Player (Standalone), Elson, Epson, Garmin-Asus, Google, Hauppage, Huawei, HTC, Humax, Hyundai, Intenso, iRiver, LG, Loewe, Microsoft, Motorola, Nikon, Nintendo, Nokia, Odis, O2, Palm, Panasonic, TV, Philips, PocketPC, SanDisk, Samsung, Samsung TV, Seagate, Sharp, Sony, Sony Ericsson, Sony PlayStation 3, Sony PSP, Sony TV, T-Mobile, Telefunken, Toshiba, Trekstore, Vodafone, Western Digital, YouTube

System requirements 
 Processor: Intel / AMD compatible at 1 GHz or higher
 RAM: 1 GBx
 DirectX: DirectX 9
 Nvidia CUDA: Nvidia GPU driver 347.09 or higher
Windows 7, 8, 8.1, 10 for current versions

Windows XP, Vista up to version 3.2.7.1 (download)

Limitations

 Bitrate Calculator does not allow to choose the number of channels for audio tracks (defaults to Stereo)
 System-wide brightness, contrast and color adjustments for videos (from Nvidia or ATI Control Panel) will be detected by XMedia Recode during the Preview and those adjustments will be hardcoded into the output file.
 Lack of documentation for codec options (hover tooltips)
 All videos default the framerate to "Keep Original", however this can sometimes create corrupt or broken videos.  The user is therefore required to choose the desired framerate every time to prevent the mentioned problem from occurring.
 Many settings for Profiles are locked down (e.g. File Extension, Video codecs, Audio Codecs) and are therefore at the discretion of the XMedia Recode developer.
 Does not allow to permanently modify or amend existing Profiles from the XMedia Recode GUI. Instead, they must be modified via a text editor.
 Max supported framerate is 180 and custom framerates are unsupported.
 The crop and resize options are sometimes problematic and do not work as intended.
 Audio normalization - Program crashes when audio output codec selected as AAC

References

External links
 

Video conversion software
Video editing software
Windows multimedia software
Windows-only freeware
Software that uses FFmpeg